Kahir-e Borz-e Pain (also Romanized as Kahīr-e Borz-e Pā’īn; also known as Kahīr-e Borz) is a village in Bahu Kalat Rural District, Dashtiari District, Chabahar County, Sistan and Baluchestan Province, Iran. At the 2006 census, its population was 361, in 70 families.

References 

Populated places in Chabahar County